Le Méridien San Francisco  is a luxury 360-room hotel in the financial district of San Francisco, California. The property was formerly the Park Hyatt San Francisco.

HEI Hotels & Resorts bought the Park Hyatt from Strategic Hotel Capital in 2006 and rebranded it as a Le Méridien hotel, under franchise from Starwood. In 2010, Chesapeake Lodging Trust bought the hotel from HEI for $143 million. Chesapeake was acquired in 2019 by Park Hotels & Resorts. In 2021, KHP Capital Partners bought the hotel from Park for $222 million.

References

External links
Le Méridien San Francisco

Skyscraper hotels in San Francisco
John C. Portman Jr. buildings
Modernist architecture in California
Financial District, San Francisco
Hotel buildings completed in 1988
1988 establishments in California
2021 mergers and acquisitions